Methanomethylovorans thermophila is a species of thermophilic, methylotrophic methanogenic microbe. It is Gram-negative, and its type strain is  L2FAWT (=DSM 17232T =ATCC BAA-1173T). It was isolated from an anaerobic reactor in a laboratory.  Its cells are Gram-negative, non-motile, and coccoid in form. It has been found to use methanol and methyl amines as substrates in the production of methane. It cannot use formiate, carbon dioxide with hydrogen, acetate, dimethyl sulfide, methanethiol, or propanol. As its name suggests, it is a thermophile, with an optimal growth temperature of 50 °C.

References

Further reading

Sneath, Peter HA, et al. Bergey's manual of systematic bacteriology. Volume 3. Williams & Wilkins, 2011.
Satyanarayana, Tulasi, Jennifer Littlechild, and Yutaka Kawarabayasi. "Thermophilic Microbes in Environmental and Industrial Biotechnology."  *Anitori, Roberto Paul, ed. Extremophiles: Microbiology and Biotechnology. Horizon Scientific Press, 2012.

External links
 
LPSN
Type strain of Methanomethylovorans thermophila at BacDive -  the Bacterial Diversity Metadatabase

Euryarchaeota